Bozan is a town in Alpu district of Eskişehir Province, Turkey. Bozon is to the east of both Alpu and Eskişehir. The population of Bozan is 1,874 as of 2011. The settlement was originally built by the ancient Persian Empire which ruled the region. According to one survey, Bozon is one of the places which were allocated to Ertuğrul, the father of Osman I, the founder of the Ottoman Empire.

References

Populated places in Eskişehir Province
Towns in Turkey
Alpu District